Robin Paul Whittick "Rob" Havers (born 1967) is a British military historian. He currently serves as president of the American Civil War Museum.  He previously served as the president of the Pritzker Military Museum & Library, the president of the George C. Marshall Foundation, and as a former Senior Lecturer in War Studies at the Royal Military Academy Sandhurst.

Education 

Havers graduated from Queen Mary University of London with a bachelor's degree in history and politics; London School of Economics and Political Science with a master's degree in later modern British history and Pembroke College, Cambridge with a Ph.D.

He is the author of several articles and books. His Ph.D. thesis, “Reassessing the Japanese POW Experience: The Changi POW Camp, 1942-45,” was published as a book in 2003 and subsequently reissued in paperback in 2013.

Early career 

He served as a professor of War Studies at Sandhurst and taught at the London School of Economics and Political Science and Cambridge.

He was  visiting professor at Westminster College. He was executive director of the National Churchill Museum.

Later career 

Havers served as president of the George C. Marshall Foundation. He came to this post from his previous position as executive director of The National Churchill Museum and vice president for the Churchill Institute at Westminster College, located in Fulton, Missouri. On 4 February 2018, Havers became the CEO of the Pritzker Military Museum & Library in Chicago, Illinois. On 1 February 2021, the American Civil War Museum announced that Havers had joined their institution as President & CEO.

Works 
 
 Reassessing the Japanese Prisoner of War Experience, Routledge, 2003.

References

External links 
 
 Havers, Rob
 

1967 births
Living people
Westminster College (Missouri) faculty
British military historians